The following is a list of events and new Spanish and Portuguese-language music that happened or are expected to happen in 2022 in the Latin music industry. Latin regions include Ibero-America, Spain, Portugal, and the United States.

Events

January–March 

 January 13 – The lineup for the returning edition of Coachella includes Anitta, Banda MS, Chicano Batman, Ed Maverick, Karol G, Natanael Cano, Nathy Peluso, Nicki Nicole, Omar Apollo, Pabllo Vittar, and The Marías.
 January 24 – Edén Muñoz announces departure from Calibre 50 to launch a solo career.
 January 29 – "SloMo" by Chanel wins the first edition of the Benidorm Fest and will represent Spain in the 66th edition of the Eurovision Song Contest.
 February 4 – Clamor by Maria Arnal i Marcel Bagès is named the best album in Spain of 2021 by winning the Premio Ruido.
 February 8 – "Ay mamá" by Rigoberta Bandini becomes the first song that failed to represent Spain in Eurovision to top the country's chart since "Lo Malo" by Aitana and Ana Guerra in 2018.
 February 12 – "Te Espera el Mar" by María José Llergo, from Mediterraneo: The Law of the Sea, wins the Goya Award for Best Original Song.
 February 16 – José Manuel Pérez Tornero, president of RTVE, announces Hispavisión, the Iberoamerican adaptation of the Eurovision Song Contest after the cancellation of the OTI Festival in 2000.
 February 24 – The 34th Annual Lo Nuestro Awards are held at the FTX Arena in Miami, Florida.
 El Último Tour del Mundo wins Album of the Year.
 "Bichota" by Karol G wins Song of the Year.
 Bad Bunny wins Artist of the Year.
 El Alfa wins Best New Male Artist.
 Ángela Aguilar wins Best New Female Artist.
 March 2 – Karol G is awarded the Rule Breaker award at Billboard's Women in Music, marking the second time a Spanish-singing artist is awarded by the institution since Rosalía in 2019.
 March 15 – The 3rd Annual Premios Odeón take place in Madrid.
 El Madrileño by C. Tangana wins Album of the Year.
 "Tiroteo" by Marc Seguí, Pol Granch and Rauw Alejandro wins Song of the Year.
 "Tiroteo" by Marc Seguí, Pol Granch and Rauw Alejandro wins Video of the Year.
 Belén Aguilera wins Best New Artist.
 March 18 – Maná's concert residency at LA Forum begins.
 March 19 – With 16.3 million worldwide streams, Motomami by Rosalía becomes the most-streamed female Spanish-language album in a single day as well as the best performing album by a Spanish artist on Spotify Spain.
 March 21 – Daddy Yankee announces retirement from music after 32 years plus a finale album, Legendaddy, and a farewell tour visiting the Americas in 2022.
 March 22 – The 10th iHeartRadio Music Awards take place at the Shrine Auditorium in Los Angeles.
 "Pepas" by Farruko wins Latin Pop/Reggaeton Song of the Year
 Bad Bunny wins Best Latin Artist
 Grupo Firme wins Best New Latin Artist
 "La Casita" by Banda MS wins Regional Mexican Song of the Year
 Calibre 50 wins Regional Mexican Artist of the Year

April–June 

 April 3 – The 64th Annual Grammy Awards take place at MGM Grand Garden Arena in Las Vegas.
 Mendó by Alex Cuba wins Best Latin Pop Album.
 Orígen by Juanes wins Best Latin Rock or Alternative Album.
 A Mis 80's by Vicente Fernández wins Best Regional Mexican Music Album.
 El Último Tour Del Mundo by Bad Bunny wins Best Música Urbana Album
 Salswing! by Rubén Blades and Roberto Delgado & Orquesta wins Best Tropical Latin Album.
 Mirror Mirror by Eliane Elias with Chick Corea & Chucho Valdés wins Best Latin Jazz Album.
 April 21 – The Latin American Music Awards of 2022 take place at Michelob Ultra Arena in Las Vegas.
 KG0516 by Karol G wins Album of the Year
 "Dakiti" by Bad Bunny and Jhay Cortez wins Song of the Year
 Karol G wins Artist of the Year
 María Becerra wins New Artist of the Year
 April 27 – The 14th Premios MIN take place at the Navarra Arena in Pamplona to celebrate the best in Spanish independent music.
 Puta by Zahara wins Album of the Year.
 Rigoberta Bandini wins Artist of the Year.
 Tanxugueiras win Best New Artist.
 April 28 – The virtual version of Latin Alternative Music Conference takes place.
 May 14 – Spain's Chanel ends third at the 66th edition of the Eurovision Song Contest with "SloMo", becoming the country's best placing since 1995.
 May 15 – Un Verano Sin Ti by Bad Bunny debuts atop the Billboard 200, becoming the second Spanish-language studio album to do so since El Último Tour del Mundo (2020).

July–September 

 July 6 – The Latin Alternative Music Conference takes place at the Stewart Hotel in New York City.
 July 29 – With 3.708 million streams, "Despechá" by Rosalía earns the biggest streaming debut for a solo Spanish-language song by a female artist in Spotify history. It aso broke the all-time single day stream record for a song by a female artist on Spotify Spain.
 August 23 – The 24th Premios Gardel take place at Movistar Arena in Buenos Aires to celebrate the best in Argentinian music.
 Oscuro Éxtasis by Wos wins Album of the Year
 "Miénteme" by Tini and María Becerra wins Song of the Year
 "Mafiosa" by Nathy Peluso wins Record of the Year
 Tiago PZK wins Best New Artist
 August 28"Envolver" by Anitta wins Best Latin at the MTV Video Music Awards, becoming the first ever Brazilian act to win a VMA. Other winners include Bad Bunny and Rosalía.
 September 26 – The 2022 Billboard Latin Music Week starts its six-day run at Faena Forum in Miami Beach.
 September 30 – Reggaeton duo Wisin & Yandel release their final album, La Última Misión.

October–December 

 November 4The 17th edition of LOS40 Music Awards take place at the WiZink Center, in Madrid.
 Dani Fernández wins Best Spanish Act.
 Motomami by Rosalía wins Best Spanish Album.
 "Música Ligera" by Ana Mena wins Best Spanish Song.
 "360" by Marc Seguí wins Best Spanish Video.

 November 13 – The 29th MTV Europe Music Awards air on MTV live from Düsseldorf.
 Anitta wins Best Latin.
 Manu Gavassi wins Best Brazilian Act.
 Kenia Os wins Best Latin America North Act.
 Danny Ocean wins Best Latin America Central Act.
 Tini wins Best Latin America South Act.
 Bárbara Bandeira wins Best Portuguese Act.
 Bad Gyal wins Best Spanish Act.

 November 15Following the announcement of the nominees for the 65th Annual Grammy Awards in 2023, Un Verano Sin Ti by Bad Bunny is first the Spanish-language album to ever be nominated Album of the Year
 November 17 – The 23rd Annual Latin Grammy Awards are held at the Michelob Ultra Arena in Las Vegas, Nevada. Uruguayan singer-songwriter Jorge Drexler is the most awarded artists with six wins:
"Tocarte" by Jorge Drexler and C. Tangana wins the Latin Grammy Awards for Song of the Year and Record of the Year.
Motomami by Spanish singer Rosalía wins the Latin Grammy Award for Album of the Year, making her the first female artist to achieve this accolade more than once.
 For the first time in Latin Grammy history, the Best New Artist accolade is presented to more than one artists in a tie, with Angela Alvarez and Silvana Estrada, the former a 95 year-old woman making the oldest person to receive the accolade.
 December 1Un Verano Sin Ti tops the Billboard 200 year-end charts, making it the first Spanish-language album to do so. It also spent 13 weeks at number one on the chart.
 December 23 – Joan Manuel Serrat makes his final concert before retiring at age 79. It was held at Palau Sant Jordi, in Barcelona.
 December 31 – Wisin & Yandel end their farewell tour La Última Misión World Tour at Coliseo de Puerto Rico.

Number-one albums and singles by country
List of Billboard Argentina Hot 100 number-one singles of 2022
List of number-one albums of 2022 (Portugal)
List of number-one albums of 2022 (Spain)
List of number-one singles of 2022 (Spain)
List of number-one Billboard Latin Albums from the 2020s
List of Billboard Hot Latin Songs and Latin Airplay number ones of 2022

Awards

Latin music awards
34th Lo Nuestro Awards
2022 Billboard Latin Music Awards
2022 Latin American Music Awards
2022 Latin Grammy Awards
2022 Heat Latin Music Awards
2022 MTV Millennial Awards
2022 Tejano Music Awards

Awards with Latin categories
29th Billboard Music Awards
64th Annual Grammy Awards
9th iHeartRadio Music Awards
17th Los40 Music Awards
39th MTV Video Music Awards
24th Teen Choice Awards
3rd Annual Premios Odeón

Spanish- and Portuguese-language songs on the Billboard Global 200 
The Billboard Global 200 is a weekly record chart published by Billboard magazine that ranks the top songs globally based on digital sales and online streaming from over 200 territories worldwide.

An asterisk (*) represents that a single is charting for the current week.

Spanish-language songs on the Billboard Hot 100
The Billboard Hot 100 ranks the most-played songs in the United States based on sales (physical and digital), radio play, and online streaming. Also included are certifications awarded by the Recording Industry Association of America (RIAA) based on digital downloads and on-demand audio and/or video song streams: gold certification is awarded for sales of 500,000 copies, platinum for one million units, and multi-platinum for two million units, and following in increments of one million thereafter. The RIAA also awards Spanish-language songs under the Latin certification: Disco de Oro (Gold) is awarded for sales 30,000 certification copies, Disco de Platino (Platinum) for 60,000 units, and Disco de Multi-Platino (Multi-Platinum) for 120,000 units, and following in increments of 60,000 thereafter.

Albums released 
The following is a list of notable Latin albums (music performed in Spanish or Portuguese)  that have been released in Latin America, Spain, Portugal, or the United States in 2022.

First quarter

January

February

March

Second quarter

April

May

June

Third quarter

July

August

September

Fourth quarter

October

November

December

Dates unknown

Year-End

Performance in the United States

Albums
The following is a list of the 10 best-performing Latin albums in the United States  according to Billboard and Nielsen SoundScan, which compiles data from traditional sales and album-equivalent units.

Songs
The following is a list of the 10 best-performing Latin songs in the United States  according to Billboard and Nielsen SoundScan, which compiles data from streaming activity, digital sales and radio airplay.

Airplay in Latin America

Deaths 
January 2 – , Spanish singer (Mocedades), 60
January 26 – Ludmila Ferber, Brazilian Christian singer-songwriter and writer, 56
January 20 – Elza Soares, Brazilian samba singer, 91
January 27 – Diego Verdaguer, Argentine singer-songwriter, 70
February 5 – Rubén Fuentes, Mexican violinist and composer, 95
February 23 – Carlos Barbosa-Lima, Brazilian classical and jazz guitarist, 77
March 5 – Patricio Renán, Chilean New Wave and ballad singer, 77
March 6 – Pau Riba i Romeva, Spanish and Mallorquín musician, 73
March 11 – Guayo Cedeño, Honduran jazz and samba musician, 48 (respiratory failure)

References

 
Latin music by year